The Dehradun Municipal Corporation is the civic or urban local body that governs the city of Dehradun in Uttarakhand, India. It is essentially the city government and differs from the MDDA (Mussoorie Dehradun Development Board), which is a state run organisation.

Structure 
This corporation consists of 100 wards and is headed by a mayor who presides over a deputy mayor and 99 other corporators representing the wards. The mayor is elected directly through a first-past-the-post voting system and the deputy mayor is elected by the corporators from among their numbers.

The Corporation is composed of elected officials like the mayor and corporator, administrative officials, like the Municipal Commissioner (also known as Chief Executive Officer) and technical officers who have expertise in various domains.

Prior to December 2003 this body was known as Dehradun Municipal Council and after revamping the municipality the Dehradun Municipal Corporation came into existence in 2003.

List of chairpersons or commissioners of the Dehradun Municipal Council

List of mayors of the Dehradun Municipal Corporation

Elections in the Dehradun Municipal Corporation

The Dehradun Municipal Corporation holds direct elections every five years in the state and the latest elections were those held in the year 2018.

See also
 2023 Dehradun Municipal Corporation election
 2018 Dehradun Municipal Corporation election
 2013 Dehradun Municipal Corporation election
 2008 Dehradun Municipal Corporation election
 2003 Dehradun Municipal Corporation election

References

External links
Official Website of the Dehradun Municipal Corporation
 

 
Municipal corporations in Uttarakhand
Dehradun
2003 establishments in Uttarakhand